David A. Dolbin Jr. (March 20, 1932 – October 3, 2017) was an American football player and coach. A standout college football player for West Chester University of Pennsylvania, Dolbin served as the head football coach at Shippensburg University of Pennsylvania from 1964 to 1972, compiling a record of 25–41.

References

1932 births
2017 deaths
Shippensburg Red Raiders football coaches
West Chester Golden Rams football players
High school football coaches in Pennsylvania
People from Harrisburg, Pennsylvania
Coaches of American football from Pennsylvania
Players of American football from Pennsylvania